Toxotrypana curvicauda, the papaya fruit fly, is a species of fruit fly in the family Tephritidae.

References

External links

 

Trypetinae
Articles created by Qbugbot
Insects described in 1860